Limbo Boots is the second album from Ali Baba's Tahini, best known as the band Jake Cinninger was in before joining progressive rock band Umphrey's McGee. This is the only album to feature Kahlil Smylie on bass, who replaced founding member Karl Engelmann in 1999.

With the loss of Engelmann, one of the band's main songwriters, Cinninger is mostly responsible for the album's direction, which features early versions of soon-to-be Umphrey's McGee classics like "Ringo" and "Mulche's Odyssey."

Cinninger would disband Ali Baba's Tahini just months after the release of this album to join Umphrey's McGee on a permanent basis.

Track listing
 Lepidoptera
 Ringo
 New Definition
 Water Movement
 On Stolen Breath
 Kat's Tune
 Mulche's Odyssey
 Air Movement
 Packin' Junk
 Four Winds
 Fraction Ictus
 Blueprints

Personnel
Jake Cinninger: guitar, vocals

Kahlil Smylie: bass

Steve Krojniewski: drums

2000 albums